The Lightning Raider is a 1919 American action film serial directed by George B. Seitz. It was the on-screen debut of Boris Karloff, albeit as an extra. The film serial survives in an incomplete state with some reels preserved at the Library of Congress Public Archives of Canada/Dawson City collection and other film archives, but it is not available on home video. The serial was shown in France as Par Amour.

Plot
A beautiful young woman is in reality a daring master thief. While fleeing the scene of her latest robbery, she meets a handsome young millionaire named Thomas Babbington North. The film belongs to the sensationalistic "Yellow Menace" genre of its time, with Warner Oland playing the insidious Oriental Wu Fang.

Cast

 Pearl White as The Lightning Raider
 Warner Oland as Wu Fang
 Henry G. Sell as Thomas Babbington North
 Ruby Hoffman as Lottie
 William P. Burt as The Wasp (credited as William Burt)
 Frank Redman as Hop Sing
 Nellie Burt as Sunbeam
 Sam Kim
 Henrietta Simpson
 Boris Karloff as an extra
 Billy Sullivan (credited as William A. Sullivan)
 Anita Brown

Episodes
 The Ebony Block
 The Counterplot
 Underworld Terrors
 Through Doors of Steel
 The Brass Key
 The Mystic Box
 Meshes of Evil
 Cave of Dread
 Falsely Accused
 The Baited Trap
 The Bars of Death
 Hurled Into Space
 The White Roses
 Cleared of Guilt
 Wu Fang Atones

See also
 List of film serials
 List of film serials by studio
 Boris Karloff filmography

References

External links

1919 films
1910s action films
American black-and-white films
American action films
American silent serial films
Films directed by George B. Seitz
Pathé Exchange film serials
1910s American films